County Kildare is a county in Ireland. It is in the province of Leinster and is part of the Eastern and Midland Region. It is named after the town of Kildare. Kildare County Council is the local authority for the county, which has a population of 246,977.

Geography and subdivisions

Kildare is the 24th-largest of Ireland's 32 counties in area and the seventh largest in terms of population. It is the eighth largest of Leinster's twelve counties in size, and the second largest in terms of population. It is bordered by the counties of Carlow, Laois, Meath, Offaly, South Dublin and Wicklow. As an inland county, Kildare is generally a lowland region. The county's highest points are the foothills of the Wicklow Mountains bordering to the east. The highest point in Kildare is Cupidstown Hill on the border with South Dublin, with the better known Hill of Allen in central Kildare.

Towns and villages

 Allen
 Allenwood 
 Ardclough
 Athy
 Ballitore
 Ballymore Eustace
 Calverstown
 Caragh
 Carbury
 Castledermot
 Clane
 Coill Dubh
 Celbridge
 Curragh
 Derrinturn
 Eadestown
 Johnstown
 Johnstownbridge
 Kilberry
 Kilcock
 Kilcullen
 Kildangan
 Kill
 Kilmead
 Kilmeage
 Kilteel
 Kildare
 Leixlip
 Lullymore
 Maynooth
 Milltown
 Moone
 Monasterevin
 Narraghmore
 Nurney
 Naas
 Newbridge
 Prosperous
 Rathangan
 Robertstown
 Sallins
 Straffan
 Staplestown
 Suncroft
 Timolin
 Two Mile House

Physical geography

The county has three major rivers running through it: the Barrow, the Liffey and the Boyne. The Grand Canal crosses the county from Lyons on the east to Rathangan and Monasterevin on the west. A southern branch joins the Barrow navigation at Athy. The Royal Canal stretches across the north of the county along the border with Meath. Pollardstown Fen is the largest remaining calcareous fen in Ireland, covering an area of 220 hectares and is recognised as an internationally important fen ecosystem with unique and endangered plant communities, and was declared a National Nature Reserve in 1986.

The Bog of Allen is a large bog that extends across  and into County Kildare, County Meath, County Offaly, County Laois, and County Westmeath. Kildare has  of bog (almost 14% of Kildare's land area) mostly located in the south-west and north-west, a majority of this being Raised Bog. It is a habitat for over 185 plant and animal species.

Coillte and Dúchas currently own 47% of the forestry. Coillte runs Donadea Forest Park which is in North-Central Kildare.

History

Kildare was shired in 1297 and assumed its present borders in 1832, following amendments to remove a number of enclaves and exclaves.

The county was the home of the powerful Fitzgerald family. Parts of the county were also part of the Pale area around Dublin.

Governance and politics

Local government
Kildare County Council is the local authority for the county. The council has 40 members, elected in the local electoral areas of: Athy (5 seats), Celbridge (4 seats), Leixlip (3 seats), Clane (5 seats), Maynooth (5 Seats), Kildare (5 seats), Newbridge (6 Seats) and Naas (7 Seats). These form the municipal districts of Athy, Celbridge–Leixlip, Clane–Maynooth, Kildare–Newbridge, and Naas. The current council was elected in May 2019.

Kildare County Council nominates three councillors to the Eastern and Midland Regional Assembly, where there are part of the Mid-East strategic planning area committee.

Former districts
Kildare was formerly divided into the rural districts of Athy No. 1, Celbridge No. 1, Edenderry No. 2, and Naas No. 1, and the urban districts of Athy and Naas. The rural districts were abolished in 1925. Newbridge or Droichead Nua, within the former rural district of Naas No. 1, had town commissioners, and Leixlip was given that status too in 1988. The urban districts of Athy and Naas and the town commissioners of Newbridge and Leixlip became town councils in 2002. All town councils in Ireland were abolished in 2014.

National elections
For elections to Dáil Éireann, there are two constituencies in the county: Kildare North (4 seats) and Kildare South (4 seats). At the 2020 Irish general election, Kildare North returned Catherine Murphy (SD), Réada Cronin (SF),  Bernard Durkan (FG), and James Lawless (FF), while Kildare South returned Sean Ó Fearghaíl (FF) (returned automatically as outgoing Ceann Comhairle), Patricia Ryan (SF), Martin Heydon (FG), and Cathal Berry (Ind).

For elections to the European Parliament, it is part of the Midlands–North-West constituency (4 MEPs).

Demographics
The county's population has nearly doubled to 186,000 from 1990–2005. The northeastern region of Kildare had the highest average per-capita income in Ireland outside County Dublin in 2003. East Kildare's population has increased rapidly, for example, the amount of housing in the Naas suburb of Sallins has increased sixfold since the mid-1990s.

 the population of the county was 246,977. Ethnically, the 2016 census recorded County Kildare as 84% white Irish, 9% other white ethnicities, 2% black, 2% Asian, 1% of other ethnicities, and 2% not stated. For religion, the census recorded a population that was 80% Catholic, 9% of other stated religions, 10% with no religion and 2% not stated.

Ethnic Groups

Urban areas and populations

Health care
County Kildare hospitals include Naas General Hospital and Clane General Hospital.

Transport

Road
County Kildare houses the hub of Ireland's network of major roads.

The N4 (M4) from Dublin to Sligo travels along the north of the county by-passing the towns of Leixlip, Maynooth and Kilcock.

The M7 from Dublin to Limerick runs through the county and bypasses the towns of Naas, Newbridge, Kildare and Monasterevin. This road is colloquially referred to as the "Naas Dual carriageway" because when it was originally up-graded in 1964 the road from Dublin to Naas was a double-lane carriageway, one of the first of its kind in Ireland.

The M9 is another motorway that commences at Kilcullen and ends at Waterford. It is motorway standard for its entire length.

Rail
The county is also served by the trains connecting with Dublin, southern Leinster, Munster and Connacht, with daily connections to Cork, Waterford, Limerick, and Galway. The principal Irish Rail InterCity train station in the county is Kildare, however, Newbridge, Sallins and Hazelhatch are also served by South Western Commuter services, while Maynooth, in northern County Kildare, is served by Western Commuter and Sligo InterCity services.

Waterway

Kildare is the centre of Ireland's Grand Canal network built in the late 18th century. This connects Kildare with Waterford, Dublin, Limerick and Athlone. The Royal Canal runs west from Dublin and parts of it form the boundary with County Meath.

Irish language
There are 4,491 Irish speakers in County Kildare; 2,451 attending the seven Gaelscoils (Irish language primary schools) and one Gaelcholáiste (Irish language secondary school). According to the Irish Census 2006, 2,040 people in the county identify themselves as being daily Irish speakers outside the education system.

Education

 Two third-level educational institutions – St. Patrick's College founded by King George III in 1795 to educate Ireland's Catholics and Maynooth University founded in 1997 – are located in Maynooth. They share campus space and many facilities. The two institutions were formally separated in 1997. Maynooth University is the only university in the Republic of Ireland not situated in a city.
 Clongowes Wood College is a private secondary boarding school for boys, located near Clane. Founded by the Society of Jesus (The Jesuits) in 1814, it is one of Ireland's oldest Catholic schools.
 Newbridge College is a co-educational fee-paying secondary school. The Dominican Order founded Newbridge College in 1852 as a boarding school for boys.
 Leinster Senior College is a small private fee-paying secondary school geared solely towards the Leaving Certificate.
 The town of Clane is home to another educational institute, Clane College, a provider of further education to the wider Kildare community.
 Naas C.B.S., Saint Mary's College Naas and Piper's Hill College are the three main secondary schools in Naas.

Sport

GAA

The nickname for the Kildare GAA team is the Lilywhites, as a result of its early jerseys being made from the bags of the Lilywhite Bakery. The all-white jerseys they wear are in reference to this.

In 1928, Kildare became the first team to win the Sam Maguire trophy for the All-Ireland Senior Football Championship, defeating Cavan 2–6 to 2–5. However, since then Kildare has reached the All-Ireland Football Championship Final on four occasions, the last being in 1998, but has failed on all four attempts.

County Kildare is also known as the Shortgrass County which is a reference to how short the grass is on the commons of the Curragh.

Golf
The Michael Smurfit owned K Club, situated on the River Liffey near Straffan played host to the 2006 Ryder Cup.

Carton House Golf Club is located in Maynooth. The Golfing Union of Ireland, the longest established golf union in the world, have their national headquarters on the estate. This facility also comprises the GUI National Academy, an  teaching facility for up-and-coming golfers, as well as being a facility available to all golfers in Ireland.

Other prominent courses are located at Knockanally and Clane.

Horse racing
Kildare is famous worldwide for its horse racing. The Curragh horse-racing course is the home to all five Irish Classic Flat races. Also located in County Kildare are two other courses, Punchestown Racecourse, home of the National Hunt Festival of Ireland, and Naas Racecourse, which runs both National Hunt and Flat meetings and is used by top racehorse trainers as a test for horses preparing for the Cheltenham festival.

The county is famous for the quality of horses bred in the many stud farms to which it is home, including the Irish National Stud and many other top studs such as Gilltown, Moyglare and Kildangan Stud, and race horse training establishments, such as the Osborne Stables.

Motorsports
Kildare is the home to Mondello Park, Ireland's only international motorsport venue. Mondello Park was awarded the FIA International race track status in 2001. It is host to National and International Race events, Motor Shows, Car & Bike Track days, Training Schools and Corporate Events.

Soccer
Kildare County F.C. was a League of Ireland club from 2002 until 2009, based in Newbridge, where Leinster Senior League side Newbridge Town F.C. was invited to join the league in 2002, however, a broader Kildare-based franchise was created instead, playing out of Station Road, Newbridge.

Places of interest 

Castledermot Abbey
Castledermot Round Tower
Castletown House
Curragh
Maynooth Castle
The Wonderful Barn

Notable people

 Arthur Guinness: Politician and brewer, founder of Guinness
 George Barrington: pickpocket, socialite
 Eamon Broy: policeman
 Domhnall Ua Buachalla: Governor-General of the Irish Free State
 Ambrose Bury: Canadian politician
 Paul Cullen (bishop): Archbishop of Dublin and Archbishop of Armagh
 John Devoy: Fenian
 Charles FitzClarence: soldier
 Lord Edward FitzGerald: revolutionary
 Michael Gorman: American politician
 Gabriel Hayes: sculptor and coin designer
 John Vincent Holland: soldier
 Michael Kelly Lawler: soldier
 Kathleen Lonsdale: scientist
 John de Robeck: admiral
 Ernest Shackleton: explorer
 Barry St. Leger: soldier

Sports

 Larry Tompkins: Eadestown GAA
 Leighton Aspell: twice Grand National-winning jockey
 Nonpareil Dempsey: boxer
 Matt Goff: Gaelic footballer
 Willoughby Hamilton: tennis player
 Jimmy O'Brien: plays for the Ireland national rugby sevens team
 Ruby Walsh : National Hunt Jockey
 Nathan Collins : Wolverhampton Wanderers F.C. and Republic of Ireland national football team.
 Mark Travers : A.F.C. Bournemouth and Republic of Ireland national football team
 Andrew Omobamidele : Norwich City F.C. and Republic of Ireland national football team
 Conn McDunphy : Professional Cyclist, 2020 Cycling Ireland National Time Trial Champion.

Writers, musicians, and entertainers

 Devon Murray: actor
 Damien Molony: actor                               
 Aisling Bea: actress, comedian
 Aidan Higgins: writer
 Teresa Brayton: writer
 Molly Keane: novelist
 Emily Lawless: writer
 Mary Leadbeater: writer
 John MacKenna: playwright, author, actor
 Paul Mescal: actor
Bell X1 are from Celbridge, County Kildare.
Luka Bloom is from Newbridge
Joseph Doyle, bassist from Irish band The Frames is from Allenwood
Graham Hopkins, drummer with The Frames, The Swell Season, and Therapy? is from Clane
Damien Leith, Australian Idol 2006 winner and singer-songwriter lived in Milltown until he moved to Australia.
Jack Lukeman, otherwise known as Jack L, is from Athy
Dónal Lunny was raised in Newbridge.
Miracle Bell, Indie-pop band, hail from Naas.
Christy Moore, folk musician, was born in Newbridge.
Liam O'Flynn from the band Planxty is from Kill
Damien Rice was born in Celbridge
Heidi Talbot is from Kill

Twinning

County Kildare is twinned with the following places:
 Deauville, France
 Lexington, Kentucky, USA

Both are major centres of the Thoroughbred breeding industry in their respective countries.

See also
 List of abbeys and priories in Ireland (County Kildare)
 Lord Lieutenant of Kildare
 High Sheriff of Kildare

References

External links

Kildare Fáilte's Tourism Pages
County Kildare Community Network
Kildare County Council
Kildare Gaelscoil stats 2010–2011
Irish Census 2006

 

 
Kildare
Kildare
Kildare